Thomas or Tom Paul may refer to:
Thomas Paul (bass) (born 1934), American bass and voice teacher
Thomas Paul (footballer) (born 1961), Swiss footballer 
Thomas Paul (minister) (1773–1831), Baptist minister and abolitionist who became the first pastor for the First African Baptist Church
Thomas Paul (priest), 18th century Irish Anglican priest
Tom Paul (footballer) (1933–2015), English professional footballer 
Tom Paul (politician) (1874–1964), New Zealand compositor, trade unionist, politician, editor, journalist and censor
Tommy Paul (1909–1991), American boxer
Tommy Paul (tennis) (born 1997), American tennis player

See also
Paul Thomas (disambiguation)